Nay Oo Kyaw Tun is a Burmese chess International Master, and a Myanmar National Chess Championship winner (2001).

References

Living people
1975 births
Chess International Masters
Burmese chess players
20th-century Burmese people
21st-century Burmese people